Laboulaye Airport  is an airport serving Laboulaye, a town in the Córdoba Province of Argentina.

The airport belongs to the Aero Club Laboulaye and has a paved runway 1200 m long by 23 m wide with a beacon for night operations.

The Laboulaye VOR (Ident: LYE) is located at the south end of the airport.

See also 
 
 
 Transport in Argentina
 List of airports in Argentina

References

External links 
OpenStreetMap - Laboulaye
FallingRain - Laboulaye Airport

Airports in Argentina
Córdoba Province, Argentina